On 6 December 2005 (Azar 15, 1384) at 14:10 local time (10:40 UTC), a Lockheed C-130 Hercules military transport aircraft of the  Islamic Republic of Iran Air Force, tail number 5-8519, c/n 4399, crashed into a ten-storey apartment building in a residential area of Tehran, the capital city of Iran.

Accident 
The aircraft, bound for Bandar Abbas on the Persian Gulf, was carrying 10 crew and 84 passengers, of whom 68 were reportedly journalists en route to watch a series of military exercises off the country's southern coast.

Shortly after takeoff, the pilot reported engine problems and unsuccessfully attempted to make an emergency landing at the city's Mehrabad International Airport, from which the aircraft had departed. The aircraft came down in a densely populated area of Hasanabad-e Baqeraf, near Tehran, crashing into an apartment building where many Iranian air force personnel resided.

Iranian State media reported a death toll of 128 victims, and some other news agencies reported a toll of 116. However, an official accident report created by the Aviation Safety Network stated that 106 people had died, including 12 on the ground. All 94 on board the aircraft were killed.

Casualties
Tehran mayor Mohammad Bagher Ghalibaf said that all 94 people on board, including 40 journalists, were killed upon impact. State radio reported at least 34 people were confirmed dead on the ground, putting the official death toll at 128. An Interior Ministry Spokesperson, Mojtaba Mir-Abdolahi, confirmed that 116 bodies were recovered from the site. However, it was later determined by the Aviation Safety Network that only 12 people on the ground had died in the crash.

The Mehr news agency reported that 40 journalists on board worked for the Islamic Republic of Iran Broadcasting, and the others were from the Islamic Republic News Agency, Iranian Students' News Agency and Fars News Agency, and several newspapers.

Iason Sowden of Global Radio News in Tehran said there were reports of charred bodies on the ground near the crash site. Sowden also said that one wing of the plane was lying in front of the building. Initial pictures shown on Sky News and CNN showed complete chaos at the scene. Earlier in the day, all children were advised to stay at home due to high levels of smog and pollution.

Reuters reported that 28 people were transported to a nearby hospital. Iranian state radio reported that 90 people sustained serious injuries. Doctor Panahi, head of Tehran's rescue services, was quoted in an interview with the Iranian Students' News Agency as saying that 132 had been injured.

Engine problems
According to the police, the pilot reported engine difficulties minutes after takeoff. An emergency landing was requested, but the aircraft crashed just short of the runway.

Rescue operation
Eyewitnesses, whose accounts were carried on the BBC World Service, have stated that emergency crews arrived within three minutes of impact. SBS World News reported that riot police were called in to control onlookers who were blamed for blocking the access of emergency workers.

Context
This crash was the deadliest aviation disaster in Iran since February 2003, when 275 people were killed as a military transport aircraft crashed in southern Iran. Due to U.S. sanctions, Iran has been unable to buy new Western aircraft (whether commercial or military) or spare parts for existing aircraft from U.S. manufacturers. American-built military planes now operating in Iran were purchased under the old regime during the 1970s. Iranian officials blamed the country's poor aviation record on the sanctions.

See also
 Aviation accidents and incidents
 1981 Iranian Air Force C-130 crash

Footnotes

External links

 

2005 disasters in Iran
Aviation accidents and incidents in Iran
Islamic Republic of Iran Air Force
Aviation accidents and incidents in 2005
Accidents and incidents involving the Lockheed C-130 Hercules
2005 in Iran
History of Tehran
Accidental deaths in Iran
December 2005 events in Asia
High-rise fires